Carl Fredrik Reuterswärd (4 June 1934 – 3 May 2016) was a Swedish painter and sculptor.

He studied with Fernand Léger in Paris 1951 and was a professor of painting at The Academy of Fine Arts in Stockholm 1965–1969. In 1974 he was a guest professor at Minneapolis School of Art, Minneapolis, Minnesota. In 1986 he was awarded the Prince Eugen Medal for painting.

Reuterswärd died of pneumonia at a hospital in Landskrona, Sweden on 3 May 2016, aged 81.

Gallery

An autobiographic trilogy
1988: Titta, jag är osynlig!, Gedins, reissued by Natur & Kultur, 2000 
1996: Alias Charlie Lavendel 1952-61, Natur & Kultur 
2000: Closed for Holidays: memoarer, Natur & Kultur

References

External links

Artifacts
MOMA
http://www.sydsvenskan.se/familj/dodsfall/konstnaren-carl-fredrik-reutersward-har-avlidit/

1934 births
2016 deaths
Swedish male sculptors
Artists from Stockholm
Recipients of the Prince Eugen Medal
Deaths from pneumonia in Sweden